Gauri Parbat, also spelled Ghori Parbat  is a mountain peak, located in Uttarakhand state, India and the height of the peak is . Also called "Horse" peak, it is near Joshimath and another peak nearby is Hathi parbat 6727 metres (22070 feet). As its height is 20,000 + feet, it was a popular destination for several mountaineering expeditions during 20th Century. Gauri Parbat along with Haathi Parbat, Nilgiri Parbat and other mountains of Kamet range tower over Valley of flowers.

Ascent
First ascent of Gauri Parbat was on 18 August 1939 by Andre Roch, Fritz Steuri and David Zogg and few sherpas.

References

Mountains of Uttarakhand
Six-thousanders of the Himalayas